Jasper ter Heide (born 29 March 1999) is a Dutch professional footballer of Korean descent. He plays as a right back.

Club career
Ter Heide made his Eerste Divisie debut for Jong Ajax on 17 August 2018 in a game against Roda JC Kerkrade as a 63rd-minute substitute for Dani de Wit.

On 31 January 2023, Ter Heide's contract with Cambuur was terminated by mutual consent.

References

External links
 Career stats - Voetbal International
 
 

1999 births
Living people
Footballers from Amsterdam
Dutch people of South Korean descent
Dutch footballers
Netherlands youth international footballers
Association football defenders
Jong Ajax players
SC Cambuur players
Eerste Divisie players
Eredivisie players